The World I Want to Leave Behind is the fourth studio album by the Canadian indie-rock band Moneen. It was released on September 15, 2009, through Dine Alone Records in Canada, and through Vagrant Records in the US.

Recording and production
Moneen started writing for The World I Want to Leave Behind in early 2008. In March 2008, drummer Peter Krpan announced his departure from the band and was quickly replaced by Steve Nunnaro. Krpan continued making music as a solo project called One Grand Canyon shortly thereafter. By this time, Moneen was already "nine songs into writing [their] next record." Moneen continued writing songs throughout 2008 in lead singer Kenny Bridges' basement for a demo to be given to various producers. The band considered working again with Brian McTernan who had previously produced Moneen's 2006 album The Red Tree. The band entered the studio in December 2008 with producers David Bottrill and Brian Moncarz.

Bridges described working on The World I Want to Leave Behind, stating "we wanted to create a record that was us, but at the same time something completely different than we have done before. We pushed ourselves harder than ever for this. We knew there was no way we could fool around with these songs. They were too important for us."

Track listing

Personnel
 Erik Hughes – bass guitar, vocals
 Kenny Bridges – vocals, guitar
 Chris "Hippy" Hughes – guitar, vocals
 Steve Nunnaro – drums, percussion
 Haris Cehajic – keyboards, guitar
 Produced by Brian Moncarz and David Bottrill

References

External links
Official Moneen Website

2009 albums
Moneen albums
Dine Alone Records albums
Albums recorded at Metalworks Studios